Jim Fleeting is an English luthier. He is best known for building the UK's first nine-string bass guitar.

The Yorkshire Post has described him as "the UK's most talented and innovative young guitar-maker".

Fleeting studied at the Roberto-Venn School of Luthiery in Phoenix, Arizona, before establishing his workshop in Yorkshire, England.

His clients include the composer and guitarist Gordon Giltrap.

References

External links 
 
 Jim Fleeting Guitars - Facebook fan group

British luthiers
British woodworkers
Living people
Place of birth missing (living people)
Year of birth missing (living people)
Musicians from Yorkshire